The High Frontier is the second studio album by American rock band Lumerians. It was released in August 2013 under Partisan Records.

Track listing

References

2013 albums
Partisan Records albums